Jeffrey Pierce is an American politician and builder from Maine.

Pierce is a graduate of Cony High School in Augusta, Maine.

Pierce was elected in 2014 and 2016 before running for a third term in 2018. During that campaign, Democratic opponents revealed that was convicted of felony drug trafficking in 1983. After being defeated by Democrat Allison Hepler, Pierce was pardoned by outgoing Governor Paul LePage in one of his final acts in that position.

References

Living people
People from Dresden, Maine
Politicians from Augusta, Maine
Republican Party members of the Maine House of Representatives
Recipients of American gubernatorial pardons
Year of birth missing (living people)